Llugwy (or Lligwy) may refer to a number of places and archaeological sites in Wales:

 River Llugwy (Afon Llugwy), in Snowdonia
 Ffynnon Llugwy, a lake in Snowdonia
 Lligwy Bay, in Anglesey
 Capel Lligwy, a ruined 12th-century Anglesey church
 Din Lligwy, an Iron Age hut circle in north east Anglesey
 Lligwy Burial Chamber, a Neolithic site in north east Anglesey
 Caer Llugwy (also known as Bryn-y-Gefeiliau), a Roman fort near Capel Curig
 Llugwy, Gwynedd, hamlet near Pennal, Gwynedd
 Llugwy Hall, ancestral Home of the Anwyl Family, near Pennal, Gwynedd